Ruguda, also known as Rakudah is a historic coastal port town located in the Sanaag region of Somaliland, near Heis.

Overview
Ruguda is a coastal town approximately 38km away from the larger Heis town nearby. Other nearby cities and towns include Erigavo (134km), Burao (389km), and Xagal (108km).

History
Ruguda was a well known landmark to navigators and legendary Arab explorer Ahmad ibn Mājid wrote of Ruguda and a few other many notable landmarks and ports of the northern Somali coast, including Berbera, the Sa'ad ad-Din islands aka the Zeila Archipelago near Zeila, Siyara, Maydh, Alula, El-Sheikh, Heis and El-Darad.

John Hanning Speke, an English explorer who made an exploratory expedition to the area in an attempt to reach the Nugaal Valley, described the port town:

Demographics
Ruguda is populated by the Sanbuur sub-division of the Habr Je'lo Isaaq.

See also

References

Populated places in Sanaag